Uncial 0213 (in the Gregory-Aland numbering) is a Greek uncial manuscript of the New Testament, dated palaeographically to the 5th or 6th century.

Description 

The codex contains a part of the Gospel of Mark (3:2-3; 4:4-5), on only 1 parchment leaf (33 cm by 23 cm). The text is written in two columns per page, 23 lines per page.

The Greek text of this codex is mixed. Aland placed it in Category III.

Currently it is dated by the INTF to the 5th or 6th century. Place of origin is unknown.

The manuscript was added to the list of the New Testament manuscripts by Kurt Aland in 1953.

The codex is located at the Papyrus Collection of the Austrian National Library in Vienna, with the shelf number Pap. G. 1384.

See also 
 List of New Testament uncials
 Textual criticism

References

Further reading 

 Peter Sanz, Griechische literarische Papyri christlicher Inhalte, Mitteilungen aus der Papyrussammlung der Nationalbibliothek in Wien 4 (Vienna: 1946). 
 S. Porter, New Testament Greek Papyri and Parchments Vienna 2008, pp. 102–105.

Greek New Testament uncials
5th-century biblical manuscripts
Biblical manuscripts of the Austrian National Library